Douglas Glacier is located on the southeast slopes of Mount Logan, North Cascades National Park in the U.S. state of Washington.

See also
List of glaciers in the United States

References

Glaciers of the North Cascades
Glaciers of Skagit County, Washington
Glaciers of Washington (state)